Cam Grout (born 23 October 1939) is a Canadian former butterfly and freestyle swimmer. He competed in three events at the 1960 Summer Olympics.

References

External links
 

1939 births
Living people
Canadian male butterfly swimmers
Canadian male freestyle swimmers
Olympic swimmers of Canada
Swimmers at the 1960 Summer Olympics
Swimmers from Montreal
Commonwealth Games medallists in swimming
Commonwealth Games bronze medallists for Canada
Swimmers at the 1958 British Empire and Commonwealth Games
Swimmers at the 1959 Pan American Games
Medalists at the 1959 Pan American Games
Pan American Games medalists in swimming
Pan American Games silver medalists for Canada
Pan American Games bronze medalists for Canada
20th-century Canadian people
21st-century Canadian people
Medallists at the 1958 British Empire and Commonwealth Games